Tim Kamczyc (born January 8, 1990) is an American former professional basketball player.

Professional career
In September 2013, Kamczyc signed with Aris Leeuwarden of the Dutch Basketball League (DBL). He averaged 7.7 points and 3.2 rebounds per game over 38 games in the DBL. Aris finished in the seventh place in the DBL standings.

References

External links
RealGm.com profile and statistics
Dutch Basketball League profile and statistics 
ESPN College basketball profile 
Eurobasket.com profile

1990 births
Living people
American expatriate basketball people in the Netherlands
Aris Leeuwarden players
Basketball players from Ohio
Cleveland State Vikings men's basketball players
Dutch Basketball League players
People from Strongsville, Ohio
Power forwards (basketball)
Small forwards
American men's basketball players